The 2014 Chicago Blitz season was the first season for the Continental Indoor Football League (CIFL) franchise.

The Blitz came into existence in January 2014, after the Chicago Slaughter announced that they would be sitting out the 2014 season just one month before the regular season began.

Roster

Schedule

Regular season

The team's final contest against the Sting ruined the Sting's chances of a perfect season.

Standings

Coaching staff

References

2014 Continental Indoor Football League season
Chicago Blitz
Chicago Blitz (indoor football)